Pigeon Peak, elevation , is a summit in the Needle Mountains, a subrange of the San Juan Mountains in the southwestern part of the US State of Colorado. It is located in the Weminuche Wilderness, part of the San Juan National Forest.

Pigeon Peak is notable both for its absolute height and for its local relief. It is the 57th highest independent peak in Colorado,
narrowly missing the well-known list of fourteeners. In terms of local relief, it is one of the most impressive peaks in Colorado. Also, its east face is an  cliff.

Climbing 

Since Pigeon Peak is not a fourteener, it sees far less traffic than the nearby trio of Mount Eolus, Windom Peak and Sunlight Peak. The standard route is not technically difficult, but it is long and requires a little-hiked wilderness approach. Climbers typically camp near Ruby Lake north of the peak. From there the route ascends to a saddle between Pigeon Peak and Turret Peak, southwest of Pigeon. The route then descends and makes a traverse around to the opposite side of the peak, finally ascending the northwest slopes. Difficulties involve class 3 scrambling.

See also

List of Colorado mountain ranges
List of Colorado mountain summits
List of Colorado fourteeners
List of Colorado 4000 meter prominent summits
List of the most prominent summits of Colorado
List of Colorado county high points

References

External links

San Juan Mountains (Colorado)
Mountains of La Plata County, Colorado
North American 4000 m summits
San Juan National Forest
Mountains of Colorado